The NinjaTel Van is a 2001 Ford Econoline E250 van, designed and converted by Bob "saberfire" Bristow and Colleen "Phar" Campbell into the base of operation for NinjaTel.  From July 26 to July 29, 2012 the Ninja Networks team created and operated a mobile cell phone network from a van placed in the Vendor area of DEF CON 20, at the Rio Hotel/Casino in Las Vegas, and the Ninja Party, at Rumor Boutique Hotel in Las Vegas. NinjaTel served a small network of 650 GSM phones using custom SIM cards.

Work on the van began in September 2011 and was completed 11 months later on July 26, 2012, just in time for DEF CON 20. 

The van hosts a mobile GSM cellular network, complete with equipment and a roof-mounted antenna.

Network 
The network uses OpenBTS, Asterisk, and an Ettus Research Universal Software Radio Peripheral to provide voice and SMS service to connected devices. During DEF CON 20 it did not have data ability.

Other deployments 
In 2013 the van was used to provide wireless network connectivity to a remote wilderness area for the production of Capture, an American reality competition television series on The CW.

Gallery

References

External links 
 NinjaTel, the hacker cellphone network - RobotSkirts

Mobile telecommunications networks